The Panama Canal Museum is a non-profit and public museum located in Panama City, Panama. Established in 1997, the museum is devoted to the history of the construction of the Panama Canal in its various stages, including the first French construction attempt, the later construction by the United States, and the eventual transfer to Panamanian control. The current building dates from 1874 and served originally as the headquarters of both the French and U.S. companies engaged in the construction of the canal. It is located in the city's old quarter.

See also
List of maritime museums in the United States

References

External links
 
 

Museums in Panama City
Canal museums